You'll Never Walk Alone is an album recorded by Doris Day with Jim Harbert's Orchestra. It was released on September 17, 1962 on Columbia Records. It contains mostly songs of a religious or spiritual nature. On April 23, 2007, it was released together with Hooray for Hollywood, Volume I, as a compact disc by Sony BMG Music Entertainment.

Track listing

Personnel
Buddy Cole - piano
Jim Harbert - arranger, conductor
Leo Fuchs - photography

References

1962 albums
Doris Day albums
Albums produced by Irving Townsend
Columbia Records albums